Key System may refer to:

 Key telephone system, a multiline telephone systems typically used in business environments
 Key System, a defunct transportation system in the San Francisco Bay Area
 KeY System, a software verification tool
 a cryptosystem using a Cryptographic key
 system of keys on a flute, such as Boehm or Albert